The Mozambican Youth Organisation (OJM), the oldest and largest youth organisation in Mozambique, is the youth wing of the FRELIMO party. It was created on November 29, 1977 and today has more than 2.5 million members. The organisation's vision is to promote patriotism, education and mobilization among young people and engage them in the challenges of development in Mozambique.

The OJM has been led by politician Anchia Talapa Formiga since 2020.  Its objective is enshrined in the Constitution of the Republic: to promote the patriotic education of young people, mobilizing them for the political and ideological objectives of the Frelimo Party. The organisation exists to promote and defend the aspirations and interests of its members and youth in general, and to ensure their representation in national and international forums.

National structure
As set out in its constitution the Mozambican Youth Organisation is led by a National Secretariat of Central Committee (SCC) and a National Council of Jurisdiction (CJN).

Secretariat of the Central Committee 
 General Secretary (Chairman)  – Anchia Talapa Formiga
 Organisation and Training – José Fole
 Mobilization and Propaganda – Licinio Mauaie
 Administration and Finance –
 International Cooperation and Projects – Milton Valente
 Student Movement and Volunteers - Mariana Cupana

Leaders

OJM leaders include:

Zacarias Kupela: 1977

Leonardo Candeeiro:

Gaspar Sitoe: 

José Patrício André: 2005 - 2010

Basílio Muhate: 2010 - 2013

Pedro Cossa: 2013 - 2015

Mety Gondola: 2015 -2020

Anchia Formiga: 2020-present

External links
Organização da Juventude Moçambicana
FRELIMO

FRELIMO
Youth wings of communist parties
Youth organisations based in Mozambique
1977 establishments in Mozambique
Youth organizations established in the 1970s
World Federation of Democratic Youth